Jérémie is an arrondissement in the Grand'Anse Department of Haiti. As of 2015, the population was 238,218 inhabitants. Postal codes in the Anse d'Hainault Arrondissement start with the number 71.

Communes
The arondissement consists of the following communes:
 Jérémie
 Abricots
 Bonbon
 Chambellan
 Moron
 Marfranc

History
In the aftermath of the 2010 Haiti earthquake, a food aide convoy transporting aide delivered to Jérémie Airport through Jérémie, encountered a hijacking attempt by 20 men, on Saturday 30 January 2010.

See also
Arrondissements of Haiti

References

Arrondissements of Haiti